"Toma" is the fourth single from rapper Pitbull's debut album M.I.A.M.I.. It features Lil Jon. It peaked at number 21 in US Hot Rap Songs and number 73 on the US Hot R&B/Hip-Hop Songs.

On several occasions, the song has been heavily edited to make it "radio-friendly". Some versions remove the English profanity in the song, while keeping the Spanish sexually-explicit verse, saying, "Si tu quiere que te coma toda", which if translated, means to "if you want me to eat you up", a reference to cunnilingus. On other versions, the whole song is "clean", removing all explicit verses.

The song was also featured in the 2006 films Step Up and Date Movie.

Remix
An official remix features various dancehall artists as Mr. Vegas, Wayne Marshall, Red Rat, T.O.K., and Kardinal Offishall, appearing in Pitbull's remix album Money Is Still a Major Issue. An unofficial remix features Nina Sky with the beat sampled from "Conga" by Gloria Estefan on a mixtape.

Charts

References

2004 songs
2005 singles
Lil Jon songs
Pitbull (rapper) songs
TVT Records singles
Reggaeton songs
Song recordings produced by Lil Jon
Songs written by Pitbull (rapper)
Songs written by Lil Jon
Crunk songs